.
Colberg Boat Works was a shipbuilding company in Stockton, California on the Stockton Channel. To support the World War II demand for ships  Colberg Boat Works  built: Minesweepers, Type V ship Tugboats, and Submarine chasers. The minesweepers were an Aggressive-class minesweeper and Agile-class minesweeper class. Colberg Boat Works was opened by two brothers in the late 1890s, William and Henry J Colberg. After World War II, Wilton, Jack and Gordon Colberg sons of Henry Colberg took over the company. The shipyard closed in 1990s.  The yard located at 848 West Fremont Street, Stockton, California. The Colberg Boat Works yard was next to the Stephens Bros. Boat Builders yard. Colberg Boat Works was on the deepwater port on the Stockton Ship Channel of the Pacific Ocean and an inland port located more than seventy nautical miles from the ocean, on the Stockton Channel and San Joaquin River-Stockton Deepwater Shipping Channel (before it joins the Sacramento River to empty into Suisun Bay.

Ships

See also
California during World War II
Maritime history of California
Moore Equipment Company in Stockton 
Hickinbotham Brothers Shipbuilders  in Stockton 
Moore Equipment Company in Stockton
 Wooden boats of World War 2
Cryer & Sons

References

Colberg Boat Works
Military history of California
California in World War II
American boat builders